Some Songs is the tenth studio album by Canadian country music artist Terri Clark. It was released on September 2, 2014, via BareTrack Records/Universal Music Canada. Clark teamed with PledgeMusic for the album.

Some Songs was produced by Michael Knox. Clark co-wrote five of the album's ten tracks.

Critical reception
Dean Gordon-Smith of The Morning Star called the album "a blunt and easy going dose of country rock without frills." He wrote that it "has a mid-range, confident sound and Clark never sounds like she’s pushing herself."

Track listing

Chart performance

Album

Singles

References

2014 albums
Terri Clark albums
Universal Music Canada albums
Albums produced by Michael Knox (record producer)